is a Japanese actress, voice actress,  and singer from Tokyo, Japan.

Biography

Filmography

Television animation
Mobile Suit Zeta Gundam (1985), Emma Sheen
 Touch (1985), Natsuko
Mobile Suit Gundam ZZ (1986), Leina Ashta
The Bush Baby (1992), Jacqueline Rhodes
The Irresponsible Captain Tylor (1993), Nurse Harumi
Blue Seed (1994), Yayoi
Lupin III: The Pursuit of Harimao's Treasure (1995), Diana
Wedding Peach (1995), Natsumi
Virtua Fighter (1995), Sarah Bryant
Magical Project S (1996), Ramia
Martian Successor Nadesico (1996), Haruka Minato
B't X (1996), B't Mirage
Burn Up! Excess (1997), Maya
Saber Marionette (1997), Marine
Saber Marionette J Again (1997), Marine
Grander Musashi (1998), Sayaka Shirase
Silent Möbius (1998), Saiko Yuki
Sakura Wars (2000), Soletta Orihime
Hataraki Man (2006), Masami Araki
D.Gray-man (2007), Eliade
Gintama (2007), Ane
The Wallflower (2007), Ranmaru's mother
 Major 4th Season (2008), Jessica
Nabari no Ou (2008), Asahi Rokujō
Monochrome Factor (2008), Haru's mother
Viper's Creed (2009), Maya
Heaven's Lost Property (2009), Harpy 2

OVA
Kōryū Densetsu Villgust (1992) (Fanna)
Idol Defense Force Hummingbird (1993) (Reiko Hosokawa)
Magical Girl Pretty Sammy (1995) (Ramia)
Burn-Up W (1996) (Maya)
VS Knight Ramune & 40 Fresh (1997) (Tequila)
Manami & Nami Sprite (1997) (Chiaki Ogata)

Theatrical animation
Maple Town (1986) (Patty)
Silent Möbius (1991) (Saiko Yuki)
Silent Möbius 2 (1992) (Saiko Yuki)
Darkside Blues (1994) (Cellia)
Night Warriors: Darkstalkers' Revenge (1997) (Mei-Ling (Lin-Lin))
Mobile Suit Zeta Gundam: A New Translation - Heirs to the Stars (2005) (Emma Sheen)
Mobile Suit Zeta Gundam: A New Translation II - Lovers (2005) (Emma Sheen)
Mobile Suit Zeta Gundam: A New Translation III - Love is the Pulse of the Stars (2006) (Emma Sheen)

Video games
Ordyne (1988) (Miyuki)
Xak: The Art of Visual Stage (1989) (Freya "Fray" Jerbain)
Xak II: Rising of the Redmoon (1990) (Freya "Fray" Jerbain)
Xak III: The Eternal Recurrence (1994) (Freya "Fray" Jerbain)
Serial Experiments Lain (1998) (Yonera Touko)
Thousand Arms (1998) (Wyna Grapple)
Assassin's Creed II (2009) (Japanese dub (Paola))

Dubbing

Live-action
Maggie Cheung
Police Story (1995 TV Asashi edition) (May)
The Heroic Trio (Chat/Thief Catcher)
Twin Dragons (1996 TV Asashi edition) (Barbara)
Executioners (Chat/Thief Catcher/Chelsea)
Green Snake (Green Snake)
Julie Delpy
Before Sunrise (Céline)
An American Werewolf in Paris (Sérafine Pigot McDermott)
Before Sunset (Céline)
Before Midnight (Céline)
Addicted to Love (Maggie (Meg Ryan))
ALF (Lynn Tanner (Andrea Elson))
Anaconda (Denise Kalberg (Kari Wührer))
Bad Girls (Lily Laronette (Drew Barrymore))
Batman & Robin (Barbara Wilson/Batgirl (Alicia Silverstone))
Bewitched (Isabel Bigelow / Samantha Stephens (Nicole Kidman))
Breaking and Entering (Oana (Vera Farmiga))
Bull Durham (1991 TV Asashi edition) (Millie (Jenny Robertson))
Bullitt (2015 Wowow edition) (Cathy (Jacqueline Bisset))
Cat People (1992 TV Asahi edition) (Irena Gallier (Nastassja Kinski))
Chances Are (Miranda Jeffries (Mary Stuart Masterson))
Commando (Jenny Matrix (Alyssa Milano))
The Craft (Sarah Bailey (Robin Tunney))
The Crucible (Abigail Williams (Winona Ryder))
Cube 2: Hypercube (Julia Sewell (Lindsey Connell))
Death Proof (Pam (Rose McGowan))
D.E.B.S. (Lucy Diamond (Jordana Brewster))
Demon Knight (Jeryline (Jada Pinkett))
Dinner for Schmucks (Julie (Stéphanie Szostak))
Emmanuelle (1996 TV Tokyo edition) (Emmanuelle (Sylvia Kristel))
Evilspeak (1986 TBS edition) (Kelly (Kathy McCullen))
Flatliners (1996 NTV edition) (Rachel Manus (Julia Roberts))
Fragile (Helen Perez (Elena Anaya))
Goal! (Roz Harmison (Anna Friel))
The Goonies (1988 TBS edition) (Stephanie "Stef" Steinbrenner (Martha Plimpton))
Happy Gilmore (Virginia Venit (Julie Bowen))
Hollow Man 2 (Dr. Maggie Dalton (Laura Regan))
Identity (2007 TV Tokyo edition) (Paris Nevada (Amanda Peet))
Last Days (Asia (Asia Argento))
Lost Girl (Dr. Lauren Lewis (Zoie Palmer))
Mr. Mercedes (Janey Patterson (Mary-Louise Parker))
The New Adventures of Pippi Longstocking (Pippi Longstocking (Tami Erin))
Noelle (Mrs. Kringle (Julie Hagerty))
The People vs. Larry Flynt (Althea Leasure (Courtney Love))
Planet Terror (Cherry Darling (Rose McGowan))
Red Dawn (Erica Mason (Lea Thompson))
Resident Evil: Apocalypse (Jill Valentine (Sienna Guillory))
Resident Evil: Retribution (Ada Wong (Li Bingbing))
River Queen (Sarah O'Brien (Samantha Morton))
Sabrina (Sabrina Fairchild (Julia Ormond))
Silent Trigger (Clegg "Spotter" (Gina Bellman))
Single White Female (Hedra "Hedy" Carlson / Ellen Besch (Jennifer Jason Leigh))
The Sorcerer and the White Snake (Ice Harpy (Vivian Hsu))
Super Mario Bros. (1994 NTV edition) (Daisy (Samantha Mathis))
Turistas (Pru (Melissa George))
Wild Things (Suzie Toller (Neve Campbell))

Animation
Batman: The Animated Series (Alice)

References

External links
 
Maya Okamoto at Ryu's Seiyuu Infos

1967 births
Living people
Japanese video game actresses
Japanese voice actresses
People from Shinjuku
Voice actresses from Tokyo Metropolis
20th-century Japanese actresses
21st-century Japanese actresses